Araria District  is one of the thirty-eight districts of Bihar state, India, and has the following villages:

A-G
 Ahmadpur
 Ahmadpur Pahi
 Ajhwa
 Ajitnagar
 Akarthappa
 Amauna
 Amgachhi, Araria
 Amgachhi Milik Arazi
 Amhara
 Amrori
 Anchraand Hanuman nagar
 Arraha
 Arraha Madarganj
 Artia
 Asabhag
 Asura Kalan Khola
 Asuri
 Aulabari
 Aurahi
 Azamnagar
 Azmatpur
 Bagdahara
 Bagesari
 Baghmara
 Baghua
 Baghua Dibiganj
 Bagmara
 Bagnagar
 Bagulaha
 Baharbari
 Bahgi
 Baija Patti
 Baija Patti
 Baijnathpur
 Baijnathpur
 Baijnathpur
 Baiju Patti Milik
 Bairgachhi
 Bairgachhi
 Bairgachhi
 Bakainia
 Bakhri Milik
 Bakhri Milik
 Balchanda
 Balua
 Balua
 Balua
 Banbhag
 Bangawan
 Bangawan
 Bankora
 Banmali
 Bansbari
 Bara
 Bara Istamrar
 Baradbata
 Barahmasia
 Barahmasia Istamrar
 Barahmasia Ranikatta
 Barahmasia Simalbani
 Baraili
 Barakamatchistipur
 Barantpur
 Barbana
 Bardaha
 Bardaha
 Bardenga
 Bargaon
 Barhara
 Barhara
 Barhepara
 Barhepara
 Barhmotar Chakla
 Barhuwa
 Bariarpur Urf Bazidpur
 Barkumba
 Barmotara
 Barmotara Hingua
 Barmotra Arazi
 Basaithi
 Basaithi Math
 Basantpur
 Basgara
 Basgara
 Basmatiya
 Bathnaha
 Batraha
 Baturbari
 Bausi bazar
 Bazidpur
 Behari
 Bela
 Belai
 Belbari
 Belbari
 Belbari
 Belbari
 Belgachhi
 Belsandi
 Belsara
 Belsari
 Belwa
 Belwa
 Belwa
 Benga
 Beni
 Bhadauna
 Bhadesar
 Bhadwar
 Bhag Parasi
 Bhag Turkaili
 Bhagchaura
 Bhaghal Halia
 Bhagkohilia
 Bhagmohabbat
 Bhagparwaha
 Bhagphasia
 Bhagpuraini
 Bhagsadullah Gachh Kola
 Bhagtira
 Bhagwanpur
 Bhairoganj
 Bhaloa
 Bhanghi
 Bhansia
 Bhantabari
 Bhantabari
 Bhaptia
 Bharaili
 Bhargama
 Bhargama
 Bhargama
 Bhargaon
 Bhargaon
 Bhatania
 Bhatauja
 Bhatgaon Chakla
 Bhatiahi
 Bhattaon Kamat
 Bhatwara
 Bhawani Nagar Bausi
 Bhawanipur
 Bhikha
 Bhima
 Bhimpur Khar
 Bhirbhiri
 Bhishunpur
 Bhorha
 Bhorha
 Bhorhar
 Bhujwdupie
 Bhuna
 Bhuna Majgawan
 Binodpur
 Binodpur
 Birban
 Birnagar
 Birnagar Milik
 Bisaria
 Bisaria Patti
 Bishunpr Bhaiaram
 Bishunpur
 Bishunpur
 Bishunpur
 Bistaria
 Bitauna
 Bochi
 Bochi
 Bokantari
 Bokra
 Bualdanti
 Budhi
 Chahatpur
 Chainpur
 Chaita
 Chakai
 Chakorwa
 Chanderdai
 Chandipur. Araria
 Chandni Ghasi
 Chandni Ghasi
 Chandni Ghasi
 Chanrarni
 Charbana
 Chatar
 Chaukta
 Chaura
 Chauri
 Chhapania
 Chhaparia
 Chhatiauna
 Chikania
 Chikni
 Chikni
 Chikni
 Chilhania
 Chirah
 Chiraiya
 Dabhara Jagir
 Dabhra
 Dabhra
 Dahgawan
 Dahipura
 Dahrahra
 Dainia
 Dak
 Dakaita
 Dakaita
 Dala
 Damadighi
 Damiya
 Dargahiganj
 Darha Pipra
 Darhua
 Daria Rai
 Darsana
 Daua
 Daulatpur
 Deghli
 Dehti
 Denga
 Deopura
 Deoria
 Deothal
 Dhakia
 Dhama
 Dhanesri
 Dhanesri
 Dhangawan
 Dhaniain
 Dhanpura
 Dhanpura
 Dhanpura
 Dhantola
 Dharamganj Baghua
 Dharmeshwar Gachh
 Dhengri
 Dhobinia
 Dhobinia
 Dholbaja
 Dhowabari
 Dhurgaon
 Diari
 Dipaul
 Dipnagar
 Dipnagar
 Dithaura
 Doargawan
 Dogachhi
 Domahana
 Domai
 Domaria
 Dombana
 Doria
 Doria Sonaur
 Duba
 Dumari
 Dumaria
 Dumra
 Durgapur
 Eidgah
 Erischan
 Farasat
 Fatehpur
 Gachh Mahadewa
 Gadaha
 Gadhgawan
 Gaigari
 Gainrha
 Gamharia
 Gamharia Milik
 Gang Jhali
 Ganj Bhag
 Garha
 Garhara
 Garuha Bishunpur
 Gausnagar
 Gelhabari
 Gerari
 Gerki
 Ghaghri
 Gharakhal
 Ghiwba
 Ghoraghat
 Ghormara
 Ghurna
 Gidhwas
 Girda
 Goarpuchhri
 Gogi
 Gogra
 Gohans
 GokhulPur
 Gopalnagar
 Gopalpur
 Gopipur
 Goshainpur
 Goshainpur
 Gunwanti, Bihar
 Gurmahi
 Gyaspur

H
 Halhalia
 Halhalia jagir
 Hansa
 Hanskosa
 Hanumannagar
 Hardar
 Hardia
 Haria
 Haribhasa
 Haripur
 Harira
 Harpur
 Harpur Kalan
 Harwa
 Hasanpur
 Hasanpur Khurd
 Hasanpura
 Hatgaon
 Hingna
 Hingua Jot
 Hingua Patti
 Hirdepur
 Hyatpur

I-J
 Ikra
 Indarpur
 Itahara
 Itahi
 Jahanpur
 Jahanpur
 Jainagar
 Jamghatti
 Jamua
 Jasodapur
 Jhamta
 Jhirwa Pachhiari
 Jhirwa Purwari
 Jitwarpur
 Jitwarpur
 Jogta
 Jokihat
 Jokihat
 Jokihat
 Jokihat
 Jurail
 pathrabari
 pathrabari

K
 Kabaia
 Kachnahar
 Kadwa
 Kahbara Bishunpur
 Kajleta
 Kajra
 Kakan
 Kakorha
 Kala Balua
 kalahi
 Kamaldaha
 Kamalpur
 Kamalpur
 Kamat Pathraha
 Kamladorha
 Kanhaily
 Kankhudia
 Karahara
 Karahbari
 Karahia
 Karahia
 Karankia
 Karhara Chhaprail
 Kariat
 Karor
 Karor Deghli
 Kasaila Gachh Garha Bhagkasail
 Kashibari
 Kathora
 Katpahar
 Kauakoh
 Kesarra
 Khair Khan
 khaira
 Khajurbari
 Khajuri
 Khajuri Milik
 Khamgara
 Khamkol
 Khapdeh
 Khapra
 Kharhar
 Kharhat
 Kharsahi
 Khawaspur
 Khirdaha
 Khoragachhi
 Khoragachhi
 Khoragachhi Milik
 Khutha Baijnath
 Khuthara Mashragi
 Khuthura Magrabi
 Khuti Kharia
 Khutti
 Kirkichia
 Kishunpur
 Kismat Khawaspur
 Kochgaon
 Kochgawan
 Kolhua
 Kopari
 Korhaili
 koskapur
 Koskapur
 Kotahpur
 Kuan Pokhar
 Kuari
 Kuchaha
 Kuchgaon
 Kujri
 Kulharia Jagir
 Kumaripur
 Kumhra
 Kursail
 Kursakatta
 Kursakatta
 Kursakatta
 Kursakatta
 Kurwa
 Kurwa Lachhmipur
 Kusamaha
 Kusiargaon
 Kusmaul

L
 Lachhmipur
 Lachhmipur Gachh
 Lahna
 Lahsunganj
 Lahtora
 Lalia
 Laruabari
 Latahri
 Lodipur
 Lohtora
 Lokhra
 Lolokhur
 Lutraha Bari

M
 Machhaila
 Madanpur
 Madhail
 Madhepura
 Madhubani
 Madhura
 Mahachanda
 Mahadeokol
 Mahadewa
 Mahalgaon
 Mahasaili Gidhwas
 Mahesh Khunt
 MaheshKhunt Jagir
 Maheshpatti
 Mahisakol
 Mahjaili
 Mahsaili
 Maigara
 Maina, Bihar
 Majgawan
 Majgawan
 Majhua
 Majkuri
 Majlispur
 Majrahi Chakla
 Majrakh
 Mal Parasi
 Malchhari
 Maldoar
 Malharia
 Malhepura
 Manbodhtanda
 Manikpur
 Manikpur Halhalia
 Manullahpatti
 Maratibpur
 Marichgaon
 Marua
 Masuria
 Masuria
 Matiari
 Maya Khori
 Mehadinagar
 Metan
 Meta Letohuj
 Miapur
 Miapur Gachh
 Milik
 Milik Arazi
 Mirdaul
 Mirganj
 Mirzapur
 Mohania
 Mohiuddinpur
 Mohni
 Motiari
 Mundmala
 Muraripur
 Murbala
 Musahari
 Musanda
 Musapur
 Nakta
 Nakta Khurd
 Nananpur
 Naraenpur
 Naranga
 Narhewa Diara
 Narpatganj
 Nathpur
 Naua Nankar
 Nawabganj
 Nawalgang Manpur
 Nawalganj Pitamber
 Newa Lal Chakla
 Nijkulharia
 Nirpur
 Pachera
 Padampur
 Padaria
 Pahara
 Pahara Sikti
 Pahasra
 Paik Para
 Paik Tola
 Paikdara
 Pakri
 Pakri
 Palasbani
 Palasi
 Palasi
 Palasmani
 Pandubi
 Paraia
 Pararia
 Pararia Ranikatta
 Parasi
 Parbata
 Parha
 Parihari
 Parmanpur
 Parsahat
 Parshadpur
 Parshadpur
 Parwaha
 Parwaha
 Parwakhori
 Pategna
 Patehpur Arazi
 Pathrabari
 Pathraha
 Pathraha
 Pechaili
 Pechaili
 Pharhi
 Pharkia
 Phasimagrabi and Phasimashraqi
 Phena
 Phulbari
 Phulbari
 Phulpur Pachhiari
 Phulpur Purwari
 Phulsara
 Pipra
 Pipra
 Pipra
 Pipra Bijwara
 Pipra Pachhiari
 Pirganj
 Pithaura
 Pokharia
 Posdaha
 Pothia
 Pothia
 Pothia
 Potri
 Pranpath Patti
 Purandaha
 Raghopur
 Raghunath Pur
 Raghunathpur
 Rahatmina
 Rahikpur
 Rahikpur Thila Mohan
 Rahua
 Rajaula
 Rajbaili
 Rajganj
 Rajokhar
 Ramai
 Ramganj
 Ramganj
 Ramnagar
 Rampur
 Rampur Kudarkatti
 Rampur Mohanpur
 Rampuradi
 Rangbaha
 Rangdaha
 Rangdaha
 Rani
 Rani Istamrar
 Raniganj
 Raniganj
 Raniganj
 Raniganj
 Rewahi
 Rupail
 Rupauli

S
 Saguna
 Sahabganj
 Sahasmal
 Saida Pokhar
 Saidabad
 Saidpur
 Saifullah Tola
 Sakraili
 Salaigarh
 Samaul
 Samda
 Sandalpur
 Sanjhaili
 Sapa
 Saranpur
 Satbhita
 Satbhita Kamat
 Satghara
 Sawaldeh
 Semaria
 Seyampur
 Shahbazpur
 Shahpur
 Shaifganj
 Shaikhpura
 Shankarpur
 Shankarpur
 Shankarpur
 Shankapur
 Shijhua
 Shoirgaon
 Shyamnagar
 Sikti
 Sikti
 Sikti
 Sikti
 Siktia
 Simarbani
 Simraha
 Singar Mohani
 Singhia
 Sinwari
 Sirsia
 Sirsia Hanumanganj
 Sirsia Kalan
 Sisabari
 Sisauna
 Sisauna
 Siswa
 Sobagmara
 Sohagmara
 Sohandar
 Sohdi
 Soksanand Bhag Khutpur
 Sonakandar
 Sonapur
 Sonapur
 Sukela
 Sukhi
 Sukhirampur
 Sukhsaina
 Sundari
 Surjapur

T
 Tamganj, Bihar
 Tamganj Toufir
 Tamkura
 Tarabari
 Taran
 Tarauna
 Tarbi
 Tera Khurdah
 Tharia Bakia
 Tharua Patti
 Thengapur Pipra Milik Arazi
 Thengpur Pipra
 Tirakharda
 Tiraskund
 Tirhutbita
 Tirhutbita
 Tonha Israin
 Tope Nawabganj
 Twojastara
 Turkaili, Bihar

U
 Uda, Bihar
 Ukhwa, Bihar
 Uphrail
 Urlaha

See also
 Araria District
 Hatgaon
 List of villages in Bihar

References

External links
 Villages in Araria
 Hatgaon

Araria